The Pumphouse ruins on Kawau Island, New Zealand, belong to the copper mine established in 1844. The mine had ongoing problems, including legal, mismanagement, and flooding. To address the latter issue, a pumphouse was built in 1854. The ruins were registered by the New Zealand Historic Places Trust (now called Heritage New Zealand) on 23 June 1983 with registration number 9. The ruins have a category I listing.

References

Industrial buildings in New Zealand
Kawau Island
Heritage New Zealand Category 1 historic places in the Auckland Region
Ruins in New Zealand
1850s architecture in New Zealand